The Strokes are an American indie rock band. Formed in New York City in 1999, the group consists of singer Julian Casablancas, guitarists Nick Valensi and Albert Hammond Jr., bassist Nikolai Fraiture and drummer Fabrizio Moretti. The Strokes discography consists of six studio albums, two extended plays (EP), seventeen singles, one video album and twenty music videos.

In January 2001, the Strokes released a demo EP, The Modern Age, on independent record label Rough Trade. The large amount of hype generated by the record, especially among the British music press, led to a bidding war among major record labels. The band signed with RCA Records, and released its debut LP Is This It in July 2001. Helped by lead single "Hard to Explain", the album debuted at number two in the UK and number 33 on the Billboard 200. Highly acclaimed by critics, Is This It was certified platinum in the US and UK, selling over two million copies worldwide.

The Strokes released their next LP, Room on Fire, in October 2003. The album did well on the charts, reaching number two and going platinum in the UK, while peaking at the fourth spot in the US. Three singles were released from the album, the highest-charting of which was "12:51", which reached number seven in the UK. The band's third album First Impressions of Earth was released in December 2005 in Germany and January 2006 elsewhere. Although critics suggested the post-Christmas release date was an indication of the band's lower expectations of the record, it was the first Strokes album to top the UK charts. "Juicebox" became the first single by the group to break into the Billboard Hot 100, and was its highest-charting effort in Britain, where it reached number five.

Released after a five-year hiatus, The Strokes' fourth album Angles (2011) became their third consecutive LP to chart at number four on the Billboard 200. Its 2013 follow-up Comedown Machine reached number ten on both the U.S. and British charts. In 2016 the Strokes released their second EP, Future Present Past. The band's latest full-length album is The New Abnormal, released in April 2020.

Albums

Studio albums

Compilations

Extended plays

Singles

Promotional singles

Other singles

Other charted songs

Videos

Music videos

Notes

References

External links
 Official website
 
 [ The Strokes discography] at Allmusic

Discography
Discographies of American artists
Strokes, The
Alternative rock discographies